Festus Agu (born 13 March 1975) is a Nigerian former professional footballer who played as a forward.

Football career

Beginnings
Agu was born in Enugu, and began his career in his country with Nitel Vasco Dagama FC Enugu, African Continental Bank FC Lagos, [Esan F.C.|Bendel United]], Enugu Rangers and Bendel Insurance FC. During his development years, he was considered to be the most promising footballer in the nation.

At the age of 19, Agu moved abroad joining Club Bolívar in Bolivia, having no impact whatsoever in one season.

Spain
Agu ventured to Spain in 1995, joining La Liga side SD Compostela. The club's chairman José María Caneda described him as "...a mix between Ronaldo and Bent Christensen" (the latter a player in the team). During his stint, he shared teams with countryman Christopher Ohen but played only eight times in the season, going scoreless in the process.

In the following campaign, Agu was loaned to Galician neighbours CD Ourense in Segunda División, where he met exactly the same individual fate.

Germany
Agu played the following eight years in Germany, starting with FSV Optik Rathenow in the NOFV-Oberliga. In his only season he scored a career-high 14 league goals, and his performances resulted in a move to SC Fortuna Köln in the 2. Bundesliga. In the following campaign, after failing to find the net, he signed with fellow league side FC Gütersloh; his spell would be short-lived, however, due to the club temporarily dissolving because of debt.

In 2000, Agu joined 1. FC Schweinfurt 05 in the Regionalliga Süd, scoring 11 goals in his first year as the club promoted to the second level. He was not re-signed however, and subsequently stayed in the category to play for VfR Aalen, netting 14 times as the Baden-Württemberg team finished in fourth place, three points shy of promotion.

In the summer of 2002, Agu returned to the second division signing for SV Wacker Burghausen. However, he failed to replicate his previous goalscoring record and was ultimately released at the end of the season. Afterwards, he played with FC St. Pauli in the Regionalliga Nord, scoring six goals in his first year but only two in the following.

Retirement
At the age of 30, Agu retired following series of injuries and relocated to the United Kingdom to start a new career in law. Agu is now a qualified and practicing solicitor in England and Wales].

References

External links

1975 births
Living people
Footballers from Enugu
Nigerian footballers
Association football forwards
Nigeria Professional Football League players
Bolivian Primera División players
La Liga players
Segunda División players
2. Bundesliga players
NITEL Vasco Da Gama F.C. players
ACB Lagos F.C. players
Bendel United F.C. players
Bendel Insurance F.C. players
Club Bolívar players
SD Compostela footballers
CD Ourense footballers
FSV Optik Rathenow players
SC Fortuna Köln players
FC Gütersloh 2000 players
1. FC Schweinfurt 05 players
VfR Aalen players
SV Wacker Burghausen players
FC St. Pauli players
Nigerian expatriate footballers
Nigerian expatriate sportspeople in Bolivia
Expatriate footballers in Bolivia
Nigerian expatriate sportspeople in Spain
Expatriate footballers in Spain
Nigerian expatriate sportspeople in Germany
Expatriate footballers in Germany